The EFL League Two Manager of the Month is a monthly association football award to recognise the outstanding team manager in EFL League Two, the fourth tier of English football. The recipient is chosen by a panel assembled by the League's sponsor, Sky Bet, and the award is announced alongside those for the EFL Championship and EFL League One Manager of the Month at the beginning of the following month. The League Two award was introduced in February 2005 when Coca-Cola was the sponsor. Their sponsorship ended in 2010.

The highest number of awards won is five by Keith Hill, all with Rochdale. Phil Brown, John Coleman, Paul Ince and Chris Wilder have won four awards each and another ten managers have won three apiece. At club level, Bury managers have won the award eight times, followed by Southend United (seven), Lincoln City and Northampton Town (both six).

List of winners

Multiple winners
Up to and including the October 2022 award.
 The below table lists all the people that have won on more than two occasions.

Awards won by nationality
Up to and including the February 2023 award.

Awards won by club
Up to and including the February 2023 award.

Notes

References

Manager of the Month
English Football League trophies and awards